Aouint Lahna (also known as Aouinet Torkoz) is a rural commune in Assa-Zag Province, Morocco. As of 2014, the commune had 470 households and a total population of 2,391 people.

References 

Populated places in Guelmim-Oued Noun